The 2001 Toyota Princess Cup was a women's tennis tournament played on outdoor hard courts at the Ariake Colosseum in Tokyo, Japan. It was part of Tier II of the 2001 WTA Tour. It was the fifth edition of the tournament and was held from 17 September through 23 September 2001.Third-seeded Jelena Dokić won the singles title and earned $90,000 first-prize money.

Finals

Singles

 Jelena Dokić defeated  Arantxa Sánchez Vicario, 6–4, 6–2
 This was Dokić' 2nd singles title of the year and of her career.

Doubles

 Cara Black /  Liezel Huber defeated  Kim Clijsters /  Ai Sugiyama, 6–1, 6–3

References

External links
 ITF tournament edition details
 Tournament draws

Toyota Princess Cup
Toyota Princess Cup
2001 in Japanese tennis
2001 in Japanese women's sport